This Side Up is an album by American pianist David Benoit released in 1986, recorded for the En Pointe label. The album reached #4 on Billboard's Jazz chart.

Track listing
All tracks composed by David Benoit; except where indicated
"Beach Trails" - 4:06
"Stingray" - 4:55
"Land of the Loving" (David Benoit, Mark Winkler) - 4:38
"Linus and Lucy" (Vince Guaraldi) - 3:31
"Sunset Island" (David Benoit, Nathan East) - 5:59
"Hymm for Aquino" - 4:43
"Santa Barbara" - 3:52
"Waltz for Debby" - (Bill Evans) - 2:33

Personnel 
 David Benoit – acoustic piano (1-8), keyboards (1-8), arrangements (1-8), conductor (8)
 Randy Kerber – keyboards (2-7)
 Michael Lang – keyboards (6)
 Jeffrey Weber – keyboards (6)
 Grant Geissman – guitars (1, 6, 7)
 Paul Jackson, Jr. – guitars (2-5)
 Bob Feldman – bass (1, 6, 7, 8)
 Nathan East – bass (2-5)
 Tony Morales – drums (1, 6, 7, 8)
 John Robinson – drums (2-5)
 Del Blake – percussion (1, 6)
 Bobbye Hall – percussion (2-5)
 Michael Fisher – percussion (7)
 Brandon Fields – alto saxophone (3, 5)
 Ernie Watts – soprano saxophone (6)
 Sam Riney – alto saxophone (7)
 William Henderson – concertmaster (1, 6, 8)
 Kenneth Bonebrake – conductor (1, 6)
 The L. A. Modern String Orchestra – orchestra (1, 6, 8)
 Dianne Reeves – vocals (3)

Production 
 Producer – Jeffrey Weber
 Executive Producers – Seth Marshall and W. Barry Wilson 
 Engineer – Allen Sides 
 Art Direction and Design – Bob Wynne
 Photography – Jennifer Maxon

Charts

References

External links
This Side Up at AllMusic
This Side Up at Discogs

1986 albums
David Benoit (musician) albums